John Cregan (born 21 May 1961) is a former Irish Fianna Fáil politician. He served as a Teachta Dála (TD) and Senator from 1998 to 2011. He is from Dromcolliher, County Limerick.

On 23 June 1998, Cregan was elected to the 21st Seanad Éireann on the Labour Panel, at a by-election to fill the seat vacated by the Labour Party senator Seán Ryan, who had been elected to Dáil Éireann at a by-election.

Cregan was first elected to Dáil Éireann at the 2002 general election for the Limerick West constituency and was re-elected at the 2007 general election.

On 1 February 2011 Cregan announced that he would not be a candidate at the imminent general election following disagreement with the new leader of Fianna Fáil, Micheál Martin.

He currently serves as chairman of Limerick GAA County Board.

References

 

1961 births
Living people
Fianna Fáil TDs
Local councillors in County Limerick
Members of the 21st Seanad
Members of the 29th Dáil
Members of the 30th Dáil
Politicians from County Limerick
Fianna Fáil senators